Paweł Magdoń (born 13 November 1979) is a Polish former footballer (defender).

Career

Club
His former club was Górnik Łęczna.

National team
He debuted in Poland national football team in the game versus UAE in Abu Zabi on 6 December 2006, scoring one of the goals.

Trivia 
 Magdoń was one of the tallest (195 cm) players in Orange Ekstraklasa
 He won the Polish Cup with Wisła Płock in 2006
 He also won Polish Supercup with Wisła Płock in 2006

References

External links
 
 

1979 births
People from Dębica
Sportspeople from Podkarpackie Voivodeship
Living people
Polish footballers
Poland international footballers
Association football defenders
ŁKS Łódź players
Pogoń Szczecin players
Wisła Płock players
GKS Bełchatów players
Odra Wodzisław Śląski players
Górnik Łęczna players
Ekstraklasa players
I liga players
II liga players
III liga players